Yuncheng railway station is a railway station in Yuncheng County, Heze, Shandong, China. It is an intermediate stop on the Beijing–Kowloon railway and was opened in 1996.

The station will be rebuilt and will become an intermediate stop on the currently under construction Beijing–Shangqiu high-speed railway.

References 

Railway stations in Shandong
Railway stations in China opened in 1996